Lowesville is a census-designated place (CDP) in Lincoln County, North Carolina, United States. The population was 2,945 at the 2010 census, up from 1,440 in 2000.

History
Mount Welcome was listed on the National Register of Historic Places in 1991.

Geography
Lowesville is located in the southeast corner of Lincoln County at  (35.421325, -81.002412). It is bordered to the south by Gaston County. North Carolina Highway 16, a four-lane freeway, passes through the east side of the community, leading northwest  to Newton and southeast  to Charlotte. It is paralleled by old Highway 16 (NC-16 Business), a two-lane road that runs through the center of Lowesville. NC 73 forms the northern edge of the CDP; it leads east  to Interstate 77 in northern Huntersville and west  to Lincolnton, the Lincoln county seat. 

Killian Creek forms the western edge of the CDP, and Johnson Creek drains the eastern side of the community. The entire community is in the Catawba River watershed.

Lowesville uses the Stanley, North Carolina, 28164 ZIP code.

Demographics

As of the census of 2000, there were 1,440 people, 552 households, and 422 families residing in the CDP. The population density was 211.4 people per square mile (81.6/km2). There were 589 housing units at an average density of 86.5 per square mile (33.4/km2). The racial makeup of the CDP was 92.29% White, 6.53% African American, 0.21% Native American, 0.83% Asian, and 0.14% from two or more races. Hispanic or Latino of any race were 1.60% of the population.

There were 552 households, out of which 34.8% had children under the age of 18 living with them, 64.5% were married couples living together, 8.9% had a female householder with no husband present, and 23.4% were non-families. 19.7% of all households were made up of individuals, and 8.2% had someone living alone who was 65 years of age or older. The average household size was 2.61 and the average family size was 2.99.

In the CDP, the population was spread out, with 24.3% under the age of 18, 7.5% from 18 to 24, 33.3% from 25 to 44, 25.3% from 45 to 64, and 9.6% who were 65 years of age or older. The median age was 36 years. For every 100 females, there were 99.7 males. For every 100 females age 18 and over, there were 99.3 males.

The median income for a household in the CDP was $51,333, and the median income for a family was $53,000. Males had a median income of $36,316 versus $24,280 for females. The per capita income for the CDP was $28,072. About 5.9% of families and 7.3% of the population were below the poverty line, including 8.8% of those under age 18 and 10.7% of those age 65 or over.

References

Unincorporated communities in Lincoln County, North Carolina
Unincorporated communities in North Carolina
Census-designated places in Lincoln County, North Carolina
Census-designated places in North Carolina